Istorija, ti i ja (trans. History, You and Me) is the eighth studio album from Serbian and former Yugoslav rock band Galija. It is the third and the final part of the trilogy consisting of the album Daleko je Sunce, the album Korak do slobode and this album. It is the third album recorded in cooperation with lyricist Radoman Kanjevac.

Istorija, ti i ja is the last Galija album recorded with guitarist Jean Jacques Roscam.

Track listing
"Trava" (N. Milosavljević, R. Kanjevac) – 2:50
"Proleće" (J. J. Roscam, R. Kanjevac) – 3:35
"Trube" (N. Milosavljević, R. Kanjevac) – 3:30
"Pod noktima" (B. Zlatković, R. Kanjevac) – 2:50
"Da me nisi" (N. Milosavljević, R. Kanjevac) - 3:50
"Godina" (B. Zlatković, R. Kanjevac) – 3:30
"Skadarska" (B. Zlatković, R. Kanjevac) – 3:15
"Seti se maja" (N. Milosavljević, R. Kanjevac) – 2:30
"Posle vatre" (N. Milosavljević, R. Kanjevac) – 3:15
"Moskva - Balkan" (J. J. Roscam, B. Zlatković, P. Milosavljević, R. Kanjevac) – 3:25
"Kao boja tvoga oka" (B. Zlatković, R. Kanjevac) – 5:30

Personnel
Nenad Milosavljević - vocals
Predrag Milosavljević - vocals
Jean Jacques Roscam - guitar
Bata Zlatković - flute
Predrag Milanović - bass guitar
Boban Pavlović - drums

Guest musicians
Bora Dugić - flute
Ensemble Renesans

Notes 
 The Riblja Čorba's 2019 song "Poslednja" contains the same chorus melody as in the Galija's 1991 song "Trube".

References 
 EX YU ROCK enciklopedija 1960-2006,  Janjatović Petar;  

Galija albums
1991 albums
PGP-RTB albums